This was the first edition of the tournament as part of the Legión Sudamericana.

Diego Hidalgo and Cristian Rodríguez won the title after defeating Andrej Martin and Tristan-Samuel Weissborn 4–6, 6–3, [10–8] in the final.

Seeds

Draw

References

External links
 Main draw

Santa Cruz Challenger - Doubles